Han i Hotit is a location in northwestern part of Albania where a border crossing point between Albania and Montenegro is situated.

References 

Albania–Montenegro border crossings